L'Étudiant noir, subtitled Journal mensuel de l’association des étudiants martiniquais en France (roughly translated as "The Black Student, Monthly Journal of the Association of Martinique Students in France"), is a journal created by the  Martinican Aimé Césaire in 1935 in Paris. The Guyanese Léon-Gontran Damas published his first pigmentary poems, and Senegalese Léopold Sédar Senghor his first articles, in the magazine while they were students. Damas would define it as "...a corporative and combative journal which aimed to end tribalization and the clan system in force in the Latin Quarter! We ceased to be Martinican, Guadeloupean, Guyanese, African and Malagasy students and became one and the same black student."

Only two copies of the journal are available, those of March 1935 and May-June 1935.

It was in an article entitled Conscience raciale et révolution sociale ("Racial Consciousness and Social Revolution") in L'Étudiant noir  (May-June 3, 1935) that Aimé Césaire would express his concept of Negritude , which he would continue with throughout his work, for the first time.

External links
Aimé Césaire's "Conscience raciale et révolution sociale" ("Racial Consciousness and social revolution") in the May–June 1935 issue of L'Étudiant noir, Journal Mensuel de l’Association des Étudiants Martiniquais en France is published at http://www.negritude-negritude.com/

1935 establishments in France
1935 disestablishments in France
Defunct literary magazines published in France
French-language magazines
Magazines established in 1935
Magazines disestablished in 1935
Magazines published in Paris
Monthly magazines published in France
Pan-Africanism in Europe
Poetry literary magazines